Aleksandar Cvetković (born 4 June 1995) is a Serbian football defender who played for Swiss club Aarau.

Club career
Cvetković moved to Switzerland in 2017, when he joined a fledgling FC Wohlen, who ceased their professional football activities at the end of the season. For the following season, he joined record Swiss champions Grasshopper Club Zürich, who were similarly struggling in the Swiss Super League. Following their relegation in 2019, he stuck with the club and, as captain of the squad, led them back to promotion in 2021.

Despite this success, he got little play time in the new season. On 12 January 2022, in agreement with the club, his contract was dissolved. Two days later, he had joined Swiss Challenge League club FC Aarau, whom he hopes to also lead back to promotion. On 28 July 2022, he signed with FC Aarau for a further two years.

Honors
Swiss Challenge League
Winners: 2020–21

References

External links
 
 
 Aleksandar Cvetković stats at utakmica.rs
 

1995 births
Living people
People from Prokuplje
Association football defenders
Serbian footballers
FK BSK Borča players
FK Jagodina players
FC Wohlen players
Grasshopper Club Zürich players
FC Aarau players
Serbian First League players
Serbian SuperLiga players
Swiss Super League players
Swiss Challenge League players
Serbian expatriate footballers
Expatriate footballers in Switzerland
Serbian expatriate sportspeople in Switzerland